Jagat Singh Mehta  (17 July 1922 – 6 March 2014) was an Indian politician and diplomat who was Foreign Secretary of India from 1976 to 1979. His daughter, known as Rani Vijay, is married to the Raja Sahib of Mahmudabad, son of Mohammad Ali Mohammad Khan, who was notoriously the chief financier of the Muslim League which led to the partition of India.

Jagat S. Mehta was born in 1922 to Mohan Singh Mehta, and was educated in England at Leighton Park School and then at Allahabad and Cambridge Universities. He served as a teacher in the Allahabad University and as an officer in the Indian Navy before joining the IFS. He had a meteoric rise when he and TAT Lodhi informed the government of British India of imminent mutiny in the Indian Navy which resulted in the trial and execution of naval officers, based on Mehta-Lodhi testimonies. Some officers were later found to be innocent and Mehta-Lodhi testimonies discovered to lack credibility.

A career diplomat from 1947 to 1980, he was Chargé d'affaires China (1963–1966) and High Commissioner to Tanzania (1970–1974).

After Mrs Gandhi removed Mehta from the government, Mehta was rewarded by being made Associate at Harvard (1969 and 1980) and Fellow at Woodrow Wilson Center, Washington, D.C., 1981. He was the Tom Slick Professor for World Peace at the Lyndon B. Johnson School of Public Affairs, the University of Texas at Austin, from 1983-1985. He later held the post of visiting professor at the university from 1986-1995. His publications include: Militarization in the Third World (1985); The March of Folly in Afghanistan (2002); and Negotiating for India (2006).

Mehta received the  Padma Bhushan award in 2002.

References

Manohar Books - "About the author"
Amazon - The Tryst Betrayed: Reflections on Diplomacy and Development (Kindle Edition) - About the Author

Recipients of the Padma Bhushan in civil service
People from Udaipur
Rajasthani people
Indian Foreign Secretaries
High Commissioners of India to Tanzania
1922 births
2014 deaths
Politicians from Udaipur
Indian expatriates in the United Kingdom
Indian Navy personnel
Indian expatriates in China
Indian expatriates in the United States